Fritz ter Meer (4 July 1884 – 27 October 1967) was a German chemist, Bayer board chairman, Nazi Party member and war criminal.

From 1925 to 1945 Fritz ter Meer was on the board of IG Farben AG. He was involved in the planning of Monowitz concentration camp, a satellite camp of KZ Auschwitz. Fritz ter Meer was sentenced to seven years in prison in the Nuremberg Trials in 1948 for "mass murder and enslavement". After his release in 1951 he was selected as chairman of the board of directors for Bayer AG.

Early life
Fritz ter Meer was the son of Edmund ter Meer (1852–1931), who founded the chemical company Teerfarbenfabrik Dr. E. ter Meer & Cie in Uerdingen, which in 1925 became part of IG Farben. His family tree can be traced back to the 15th Century.
 
After completing his schooling from 1903 to 1908 ter Meer studied in France and Germany also briefly chemistry and law. He received his doctorate in 1909 in Berlin with regard to the thesis of the ether Isonitrosoketonen. Subsequently, in-depth studies followed the dye chemistry in Krefeld and abroad in France and England.

Career
Thereafter, he worked in the family-owned company Dr. E. ter Meer & Co., where he held senior positions and in 1919 became a member of the Board. After the merger he worked for IG Farben until 1945. Meer was responsible for running negotiations between IG Farben and Standard Oil. 

From 1925 to 1945 Fritz ter Meer was on the board of IG Farben AG. He was also from 1932 a member of the Working Committee and the Technical Committee, Head of Division II in the War Ministry and the defense industry.

Nazi support during World War II
In May 1937, he joined the Nazi Party (NSDAP). On 7 September 1939 he and Henry agreed with the Army Ordnance Hörlein the production of the gas Tabun, an extremely toxic nerve agent. More than 100 prisoners of war were used during construction of the designated poison gas factory in Dyhernfurth. 

He was involved in the planning of Monowitz concentration camp, a satellite camp of KZ Auschwitz and responsible for helping build the IG Farben Buna Werke factory at Auschwitz, which conducted human experiments and held some 25,000 slave labourers under deplorable conditions.   

In September 1943 he became General Agent for Italy, the Reich Minister for armaments and war production.
In 1943 ter Meer received the Knight's Cross of War Merit Cross.

War crimes trial
Fritz Ter Meer was incarcerated at Kransberg Castle in July, 1945, under Operation Dustbin. 

In 1945 the US began investigating the IG Farben for potential war crime violations, and US attorneys began questioning Farben executives. In 1946 Meer began writing company memos that tried to hide IG Farben's service to the Nazi party and the Hitler administration. On May 3, 1947, Meer along with 23 other board members and executives of IG Farben were charged with five counts of war crimes by US attorneys at the Nuremberg Military Tribunals:
Planning, preparation, initiation, and waging of wars of aggression and invasions of other countries
Plunder and spoliation
Slavery and mass murder
Membership in the SS
Common plan or conspiracy
On August 27, 1947, the IG Farben Trial began. The trial lasted 152 days, ending on May 28, 1948. On July 29, 1948 the verdict was announced. On counts 1 and 5, specifically relating to the waging of wars, the defendants were found not guilty; while the court found the defendants had worked to assist the Nazi party there was not evidence the executives were directly advising Hitler. However, on the rest of the counts (mass murder/enslavement, plunder, SS membership), Meer – along with other executives – was found guilty as charged. He was sentenced to seven years imprisonment. The court, in part of its findings regarding Meer wrote:
"The inference is strong that Farben officials subordinate to Ter Meer took the initiative in securing the services of these inmates at the plant site. This inference is further supported by the fact that Farben at its own expense and with funds appropriated by the TEA [Technical Committee], of which Ter Meer was chairman, built Camp Monowitz for the specific purpose of housing its concentration-camp workers. We are convinced beyond a reasonable doubt that the officials in charge of Farben construction went beyond the necessity created by the pressure of government officials and may be justly charged with taking the initiative in planning for and availing themselves of the use of concentration-camp labor. Of these officials Ter Meer had greatest authority."

Bayer chairmanship and later life
He was released early in the summer of 1950 because of "good behaviour" from Landsberg Prison. In 1956 Meer became Chairman of the board for IG Farben spinoff, Bayer AG. He held the position of supervisory board chairman until 1964. In subsequent years, he also took on board positions at a number of other companies, including, among others, Theodor Goldschmidt, Commerzbank, Association of German Banks, Duewag, VIAG and Union Bank AG, West Germany.

He retired in 1961.

In his memory, his employer set up the Fritz-ter-Meer-Stiftung, now called the Bayer Science & Education Foundation, which promotes chemistry students through scholarships.

References

Additional sources

Deutschland Radio Berlin 30/6/98 

1884 births
1967 deaths
People from Krefeld
20th-century German chemists
IG Farben people
Holocaust perpetrators in Poland
German chemical industry people
People convicted by the United States Nuremberg Military Tribunals
German people convicted of war crimes
German people convicted of crimes against humanity